The Basilica of Sts. Vitalis, Valeris, Gervase and Protase is an ancient  Catholic church in Rome, and is both a minor basilica and a titular cardinalatial title. It is commonly called the Basilica di San Vitale.

History 

The basilica was built in 400 with funds provided by Vestina, a wealthy widow, and was consecrated by Pope Innocent I in 401/402. It was dedicated to Ss. Gervasius and Protasius, and called the "titulus Vestinae". The dedication to St. Vitalis and his family (Saint Valeria, his wife, and Sts. Gervasius and Protasius, their sons) is dated to 412. This church is recorded as Titulus Vestinae in the acts of the 499 synod of Pope Symmachus, and three priests from the church subscribed their names.

San Vitale was restored several times, most importantly when it was extensively rebuilt by Pope Sixtus IV before the Jubilee of 1475. Other interventions took place in 1512 under Cardinal del Monte; in 1598, in 1859 by the generosity of Pope Pius IX; in 1938 and 1960. Because of changes in the city over the centuries, the floor level of the church is now several metres below the level of the street on which it is located, the present-day via Nazionale.

Customs
Free bread was distributed to the poor by the church every Friday, according to the will of a gentleman from the Marches, Francesco Silla.

Architectural and Artistic Features

Exterior 

The portico is the most ancient part of the church, possibly dating back to the 5th century. It was altered at the end of the 16th century. The inscription on the portico, with the arms of Pope Sixtus IV, dates from this time. Pope Pius IX built the staircase to the 5th century portico in 1859.

Interior 

The church has a single nave, with walls frescoed with scenes of martyrdom, among which a  Martyrdom of St Ignatius of Antioch, in which a ruined Colosseum is depicted. The apse, a surviving part of the original 5th century church, is decorated with a fresco by Andrea Commodi, The Ascent to Calvary.

Cardinal Priests 
Among the cardinals who previously took their title from the church were: John Fisher, executed for treason in 1535 by Henry VIII of England; and Giovanni Maria Ciocchi del Monte, who became Pope Julius III (1550–1555). The titulus was suppressed by Pope Clement VIII in 1596. It was united with the nearby Jesuit church of S. Andrea.

The titulus was restored by Pope Leo XIII in 1880, with the appointment of Cardinal Andon Bedros IX Hassoun. The current Cardinal Priest is Cardinal Adam Maida.

Caelius Januarius (attested 499)
...
Lictifredus (attested 1128–1130; 1133–1140)
Matthaeus (1130)
Thomas (1141–1146)
Theodinus (1166–1179)
...
Gregorius (1202–1207)
Joannes de Castrocoeli (1294–1295)
Petrus de Capella (1305–1306)
Jacques Duèse (1312–1313)
Bertrand de la Tour, O.Min . (1320–1323)
Joannes de Convenis (Jean de Comminges) (1327–1331)
Elias de Nabinalis, O.Min. (1342–1348)
Nicolaus Capocci (1350–1361)
Guillaume de Chanac, O.S.B. (1371–1383)
Jean de Muriolo (Murol) (1385–1399) (Avignon Obedience)
Peter von Schaumberg (1440−1469)
Ausiàs Despuig (1473–1477)
Cristoforo della Rovere (1477–1478)
Domenico della Rovere (1478–1479)
Ferry de Clugny (1480–1482)
Joan Margarit i Pau (1483–1484)
Giovanni Conti (1489–1493)
Raymond Peraudi (1496–1499)
Jaime Serra i Cau (1500–1502)
Gianstefano Ferrero (1502–1505)
Antonio Ferrero (1505–1508)
René de Prie (1509–1511)
Antonio Maria Ciocchi del Monte (1511–1514)
Francesco Conti (1517–1521)
Marino Grimani (1528–1532)
Esteban Gabriel Merino (1533–1534)
John Fisher (1535)
Gasparo Contarini (1535–1537)
Giovanni Maria Ciocchi del Monte (1537–1542)
Giovanni Morone (1542–1549)
Filiberto Ferrero (1549)
Giovanni Ricci (1551–1566)
Luigi Pisani (1566–1568)
Luigi Cornaro (1568–1569)
Gaspar Cervantes (June 1570)
Pietro Donato Cesi (1570–1584)
Costanzo da Sarnano, O.Min.Conv. (1587)
Antonio Sauli (1588–1591).

Restored title
Andon Bedros IX Hassoun (1880–1884)
Guglielmo Massaia, O.F.M.Cap. (1884–1889)
Albin Dunajewski (1891–1894)
Jan Puzyna de Kosielsko (1902–1911)
Louis-Nazaire Bégin (1914–1925)
Vicente Casanova y Marzol (1925–1930)
Karel Kašpar (1935–1941)
Manuel Arce y Ochotorena (1946–1948)
Benjamín de Arriba y Castro (1953–1973)
František Tomášek (1977–1992)
Adam Maida (1994–present)

References

Bibliography

  
 
 
 Forcella, Vencenzo (1877). Le inscrizioni delle chiese e d'altri edifici di Roma Volume XI (Roma: L. Cecchini 1877). (in Latin and Italian)

External links 
 Official website of the Basilica di San Vitale

401 establishments
Vitale
5th-century establishments in Italy
5th-century establishments in the Roman Empire
15th-century Roman Catholic church buildings in Italy
Vitale
Vitale
Vitale